Comedy Club may refer to:

Comedy club, a venue where people watch or listen to comedic performances
The Comedy Club, a historically important jazz venue in Baltimore, Maryland, U.S., run by Ike Dixon
Comedy Club (TV program), a Russian stand-up comedy TV show

See also

List of comedy clubs in the United States
:Category:Comedy venues